Hugonia macrophylla is a species of plant in the Linaceae family. It is endemic to Cameroon.  Its natural habitat is subtropical or tropical moist lowland forests. It is threatened by habitat loss.

References

Endemic flora of Cameroon
macrophylla
Vulnerable plants
Taxonomy articles created by Polbot
Taxa named by Daniel Oliver